Bagh-e Bahadoran (also Romanized as Baghbaderan, Bāghbadorān and Bāghbāderān; also known as Bāgh Bādārān, and BāghBāderān) is a city and capital of Bagh-e Bahadoran District, in Lenjan County, Isfahan Province, Iran. At the 2006 census, its population was 8,808, in 2,432 families.

References

Populated places in Lenjan County
Cities in Isfahan Province